Pookkottoor is a village in Eranad taluk, and a suburb of Malappuram, Kerala, India. It is on National Highway 966, and there is a state road from the town to Manjeri.

It was the centre of the Malabar Rebellion of 1921 that shook the British administration in the erstwhile Malabar district of Madras Province.

Malabar Karshikotsavam & Krishi Mela (from 18th  to 30 May 2013) was an initiative by Mr. P.A. Salam by collaborating Kerala Agricultural University, Youth Clubs & Pookkottur Grama Panchayath to transform  Pookkottur as a model Sustainable Green Village of Kerala.

Important Landmarks
 Pookkotur Juma Masjidh
 1921 War Memorial:  Tombs of 460 Mappilas who were killed in battle during the Mappila revolt against Britain in 1921 at Pookkottur  
 "Pookkotur gate". The Pookkottur war memorial gate is dedicated to those killed in the Pookkottur battle. Along with these monuments, abandoned

See also
 Nediyiruppu
 Valluvambram
 Arimbra Hills

Image Gallery

External links 
 http://wikimapia.org/2610009/
 https://archive.today/20130626181037/http://kau.edu/ec_2013.htm	
 https://archive.today/20130626180506/http://kau.edu/gc_2013.htm	
 http://www.lsg.kerala.gov.in/pages/lb_general_info.php?intID=5&ID=934&ln=en

Suburbs of Malappuram